Silver Eye is the seventh studio album by English electronic music duo Goldfrapp, released on 31 March 2017 by Mute Records. The album's first single, "Anymore", was released to digital music retailers on 23 January 2017 after its premiere on Lauren Laverne's BBC Radio 6 show.

Background and release
In July 2015, Alison Goldfrapp announced on Twitter that the group had returned to the studio to work on music for the forthcoming seventh album, but was mum as to a release date, stating she could only generalize it to be "sometime in 2017". This came after finishing their tour to promote their last album, Tales of Us, and scoring a Royal National Theatre production of Medea. Goldfrapp noted their desire to do something different from previous albums Supernature and Head First, eventually bringing in John Congleton (Blondie, St Vincent, Swans) and The Haxan Cloak to produce on the strength of his work on Björk's 2015 album Vulnicura.

In early December 2016, Goldfrapp posted on their Instagram page the covers of their first six studio albums, and later that month, the band posted an image of two topless figures with bleached blonde hair holding each other's heads with arms slicked with a black, oil-like substance. The social media upload contained the hashtag #goldfrapp7, implying it was a piece born from the album's creative and marketing campaign. The title of the album, Silver Eye, was accidentally leaked with the posting of a pre-order link on the HMV website on 21 January 2017, and was later confirmed in a press release by the band on 23 January.

The press release also announced the release of the album's opening track, "Anymore", as the album's lead single. Released on 9 February, the official music video for "Anymore" was directed by Alison Goldfrapp, produced by Mary Calderwood, and filmed in Fuerteventura. Two further tracks were released ahead of the album. On 9 March 2017, Goldfrapp premiered the album's closing track, "Ocean", through Billboard and released to digital music retailers on 10 March. "Moon in Your Mouth" was released on 24 March 2017.

The music video for the second single "Systemagic" premiered on 24 April 2017.  The music video for the third single "Everything Is Never Enough" premiered on Nowness on 7 September 2017.

On 19 May 2018 it was announced on the band's social media pages that an announcement and video were to be unveiled over the weekend. On May 21, 2018, a remix of "Ocean" featuring Dave Gahan was released worldwide, along with the news that it would be the lead single from a deluxe edition of Silver Eye.

Critical reception

Silver Eye received generally positive reviews from music critics. At Metacritic, which assigns a weighted mean rating out of 100 to reviews from mainstream critics, the album received an average score of 74, based on 21 reviews.

Commercial performance
Silver Eye debuted at number six on the UK Albums Chart, selling 11,733 copies in its first week.

Track listing

Notes
  signifies an additional producer
  signifies a co-producer

Personnel
Credits adapted from the liner notes of Silver Eye.

Goldfrapp
 Alison Goldfrapp – vocals, instruments
 Will Gregory – instruments

Additional musicians

 Andy Savours – programming 
 David Wrench – additional programming
 John Congleton – additional drum programming 
 Nick Batt – additional drum programming 
 Charlie Jones – bass guitar 
 Sebastian Sternberg – live drum loops 
 Robert Brian – drums 
 Leo Abrahams – guitar

Technical personnel

 Goldfrapp – production, engineering
 The Haxan Cloak – co-production ; additional production 
 John Congleton – co-production ; additional production 
 Leo Abrahams – additional production 
 Andy Savours – additional production 
 David Wrench – mixing
 Marta Salogni – mix engineering
 Sebastian Sternberg – live drum loops recording 
 Mark Frith – drum recording 
 Iain Berryman – additional engineering
 Alessandro Baldessari – additional engineering
 Pete Hutchings – additional engineering
 Marco Migliari – additional engineering
 Ted Jensen – mastering at Sterling Sound, New York City 
 Matt Colton – mastering at Alchemy, London

Artwork
 Alison Goldfrapp – art direction, photography
 Mat Maitland – album design

Charts

References

2017 albums
Albums produced by John Congleton
Albums produced by Leo Abrahams
Goldfrapp albums
Mute Records albums